Gabai may refer to:
Gabai, a surname.
Gabay, a surname.
Gabbai, one who assists in the running of a synagogue.
The Gabai River in Malaysia, which includes the Gabai Falls